Riddim is a subgenre of dubstep known for its heavy use of repetitive and minimalist sub-bass and triplet percussion arrangements. It shares the same name as the Jamaican genre that influenced both it and dubstep, which originally derived from dub, reggae, and dancehall. Originating in the United Kingdom, specifically Croydon, in the early 2010s as a resurgence of the style used by early dubstep works, riddim started to gain mainstream presence in the electronic music scene around 2015.

Despite receiving criticism for its sometimes repetitive drops, it has grown in popularity due to various well-known electronic music DJs playing songs of the subgenre in their live sets as well as various well-known electronic music artists producing the genre.

History

Origins and evolution
The term "riddim" is the Jamaican Patois pronunciation of the English word "rhythm", with the genre sharing a name with the genre it is primarily derived from. The derived genre originally stemmed from  dub, reggae, and dancehall. Although the term was widely used by MCs since the early days of dancehall and garage music, it was later adopted by American dubstep producers and fans to describe what was originally referred to as "wonky dubstep". As a subgenre, riddim started to gain mainstream presence in the electronic music scene around 2015.

As all riddim works of music are dubstep, their histories and notable artists can be considered closely intertwined. Riddim can be traced back to several dubstep artists, including Jakes and Rusko. Although not considered a riddim artist, Rusko originally produced dubstep that featured riddim-esque bassline patterns. Jakes is credited by many as being the first riddim artist, and served as direct inspiration for the following wave of producers. From that wave, artists like Subfiltronik are credited for establishing what riddim is known as today.

Various other artists have been credited for having contributed to the rise of the subgenre, including Bukez Finezt, Coffi, The Monsters, Coki from Digital Mystikz, and Kromestar.

Growth
In January 2018, German DJ and producer Virtual Riot released his riddim-focused extended play German Engineering, which peaked at the No. 11 spot on Billboard's Dance/Electronic Album Sales chart. In February 2019, American multi-platinum artist Marshmello collaborated with riddim producer Svdden Death to release the song "Sell Out". Although the song was criticised for being an "easy cop-out to increase variety" within Marshmello's discography, the song charted on Billboard's Hot Dance/Electronic Songs at the No. 36 position. Svdden Death's later released extended play Voyd: 1.5 debuted at the No. 8 on Billboard's Dance/Electronic Albums.

Branching subgenres

Melodic/Future Riddim
In the latter half of the 2010s, Melodic Riddim began to gain notoriety via producers like Chime and Ace Aura. Melodic Riddim is a subgenre of Riddim that contains more melodic qualities, crystalline or liquid textures, and bright production. It focuses more on the melody, like regular Melodic Dubstep, but the synths, while having a melody, are usually a little aggressive and detuned. Also, Melodic Riddim has a kick and a clap instead of a single snare, like other forms of Riddim. In 2020, the term "Colour Bass" began to encompass this style of production and expand upon it. ""Colour Bass" is a categorization of bass music coined by Chime that focuses on melody, emotion, and vibrancy. The sub-genre sits equidistant between supersaw-punctuated melodic dubstep and more aggressive, impact-focused dubstep - creating a world that takes the best from both sides."

Characteristics

Rhythmically the style utilises repetitive, minimalistic layers and triplet percussion arrangements. Like dubstep, riddim is often produced at a tempo of 140 to 150 beats per minute and was noted as having comparatively more "space", atmosphere, and "super dark textures" by riddim producer Infekt. Jayce Ullah-Blocks of EDM Identity characterized modern riddim with the presence of low-frequency oscillation (LFO) sawtooth waves, wide delays, and a large use of flanger and chorus filters.

References

Electronic dance music genres
Dubstep
Fusion music genres
2010s in music
English styles of music